Innovation Plaza is a pocket park in the University City section Philadelphia, Pennsylvania, located in the 37th Street corridor that features a innovators walk of fame for various scientists including Jen Bartik who worked on the ENIAC and others.  The park was dedicated in December 2015.  The park is a collaborative effort between various organizations and the Science Center to come up with a design that caters to the diverse cultures in the area.

References

Parks in Philadelphia
University City, Philadelphia
Pocket parks